João Ricardo Agostinho Coelho (born 4 April 1999) is a Portuguese sprinter.

In 2022, he established the National Record (indoor) on 200 m.
He won the gold medal during the 2022 Mediterranean Games in Oran, with his personal best, 45.41s, on 400 m.

Notes and references
João Coelho statistics

1999 births
Living people
People from Vila Franca de Xira
Portuguese male sprinters
S.L. Benfica athletes
Athletes (track and field) at the 2019 European Games
European Games medalists in athletics
European Games bronze medalists for Portugal
Athletes (track and field) at the 2022 Mediterranean Games
Mediterranean Games gold medalists for Portugal
Mediterranean Games medalists in athletics
21st-century Portuguese people